Devadas may refer to:
 Devadas (1989 film), a Malayalam film, based on the novel Devdas
 Devadas (2018 film), an Indian Telugu-language action comedy film

See also
 Devdas, a Bengali novel by Sarat Chandra Chattopadhyay